Josef Schediwy (died 14 September 1915) was an Austrian footballer. He played in four matches for the Austria national football team from 1903 to 1909.

References

External links
 

Year of birth missing
1915 deaths
Austrian footballers
Austria international footballers
Place of birth missing
Association footballers not categorized by position